= J. Kermit Coble =

American politician

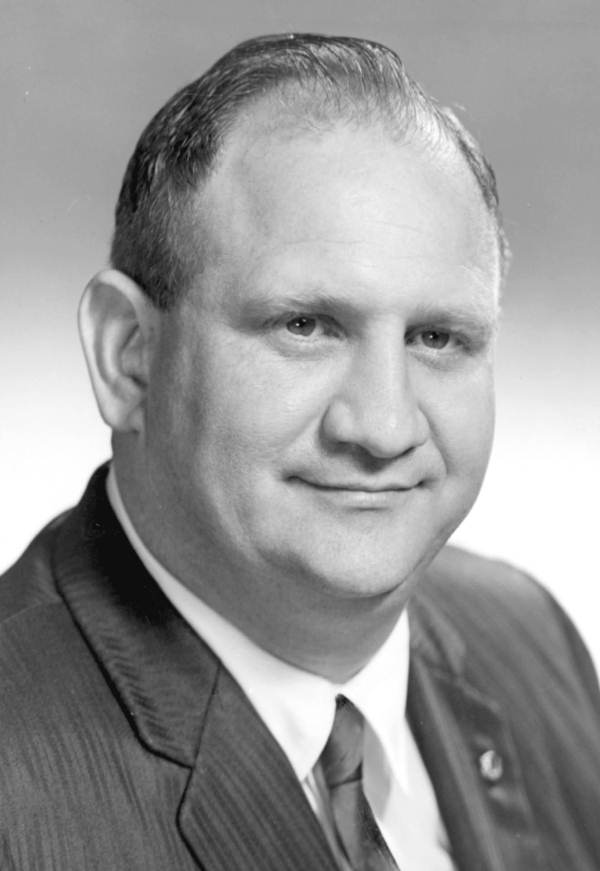
- Coble in 1965

Member of the Florida House of Representatives from Volusia County
- In office 1965–1966

Personal details
- Born: August 12, 1925 Greensboro, North Carolina, U.S.
- Died: 2000 (aged 74)
- Party: Democratic
- Education: Stetson University; University of Miami

J. Kermit Coble (August 12, 1925 – 2000) was an American politician. He served as a Democratic member of the Florida House of Representatives.

== Life and career ==
Coble was born in Greensboro, North Carolina. He attended Stetson University and the University of Miami.

Coble served in the Florida House of Representatives from 1965 to 1966.

Coble died in 2000.
